Sandeep or Sundeep (Devanagari: सन्दीप् 
sandīp or संदीप् saṃdīp) is a common Indian given name. The name may be derived either from the Sanskrit , referring to a burning flame or lamp, or from the name of Sandipani (Sandīpanī Muni), the guru of Krishna.

Notable persons

Sandeep Acharya, Indian singer
Sandeep Baswana (born 1973), Indian television actor
Sandeep Bavanaka, Indian cricketer
Sandeep Bakhshi, Indian banker
Sandeep Chowta, Indian music director
Sandeep Das, Indian Tabla player and composer
Sandeep Dikshit, Indian politician
Sundeep Jora, Nepalese cricketer
Sandeep Joshi (Assam cricketer), Indian cricketer
Sandeep Joshi (Haryana cricketer), Indian cricketer
Sandeep Jyoti, cricketer
Sandeep Kandola, Indian Kabaddi player
Sandeep Khare, Marathi poet, performing artist, actor, singer-songwriter, copywriter
Sandeep Khosla, Indian fashion designe
Sundeep Kishan, Indian actor from Telugu films
Sandeep Kulkarni, Indian film actor
Sandeep Kumar (disambiguation)
Sandeep Lamichhane, Nepalese cricketer
Sundeep Malani (born 1971), Indian film director
Sandeep Mathrani (born 1962), Indian-born American real-estate magnate
Sandeep Mukherjee (born 1964), Indian-American artist
Sandeep Naik, Indian politician
Sandeep Nath, Indian lyricist, composer, screenwriter, and director
Sandeep Pampally, Indian film director
Sandeep Pandey, Indian social activist
Sandeep Parikh, American writer, director, actor and producer
Sandeep Pathak, Indian politician and Rajya Sabha member
Sandeep Pathak, Indian actor active in Marathi cinema
Sandeep Patil, Indian cricketer
Sandeep Rajora (born 1967), Indian television actor
Sandeep Sejwal, Indian swimmer
Sandeep Sharma (born 1993), Indian cricketer
Sandeep Shetty, Indian actor
Sandeep Shirodkar, Indian film composer and music director
Sandeep Singh, Indian hockey player
Sandeep Singh Brar, Sikh historian
Sandeep Unnikrishnan AC, major in the Indian Army
Sandeep Vanga, Indian director and screenwriter
Sundeep Waslekar (born 1959), Indian thinker
Sandeep Warrier, Indian Cricketer

See also 

 Sandeep (disambiguation)

Indian unisex given names